Hélène Huart (born 19 June 1965 at Figeac) is a former French athlete who specialized in the 400 meters hurdles.

Biography  
Huart won three titles of champion of France in the 400m hurdles: in 1985, 1987 and 1988.

She placed seventh in the 4 × 400 m relay during the 1987 World Championships in Athletics, in the company of Nathalie Simon,  Nadine Debois and Fabienne Fischer.

She won the title in the 400m hurdles at the 1989 Games of La Francophonie.

Prize list  
 French Championships in Athletics   :  
 3 times winner of the 400m hurdles in 1985,  1987 and 1988.

Records

Notes and references  
 Docathlé2003, Fédération française d'athlétisme, 2003, p. 409

1965 births
Living people
French female hurdlers
20th-century French women